Innisfree is a village in central Alberta, Canada. It is located 52 km west of Vermilion along the Yellowhead Highway.

Demographics 

The population of the Village of Innisfree according to its 2017 municipal census is 223.

In the 2016 Census of Population conducted by Statistics Canada, the Village of Innisfree recorded a population of 193 living in 96 of its 126 total private dwellings, a  change from its 2011 population of 220.

See also 
List of communities in Alberta
List of villages in Alberta

References

External links 

1911 establishments in Alberta
County of Minburn No. 27
Villages in Alberta